The 27th Dáil was elected at the 1992 general election on 25 November 1992 and met on 14 December 1992. The members of Dáil Éireann, the house of representatives of the Oireachtas (legislature) of Ireland, are known as TDs. The 27th Dáil lasted  days. The 27th Dáil saw a change of Taoiseach from Albert Reynolds to John Bruton in December 1994, the only time there was a new Taoiseach with a change in the party composition of the government during a Dáil term. The 27th Dáil was dissolved by President Mary Robinson on 15 May 1997, at the request of the Taoiseach, John Bruton.

Composition of the 27th Dáil

23rd Government of Ireland (1993–1994) coalition parties denoted with bullets
24th Government of Ireland (1994–1997) coalition parties denoted with daggers

Graphical representation
This is a graphical comparison of party strengths in the 27th Dáil from January 1993. This was not the official seating plan.

Ceann Comhairle
On 14 December 1992, Seán Treacy (Ind) was proposed by Albert Reynolds and seconded by John Bruton for the position of Ceann Comhairle. Treacy was approved without a vote. On 23 April 1997, Treacy announced to the Dáil that would not be availing of his constitutional right to automatic re-election to the 28th Dáil.

TDs by constituency
The list of the 166 TDs elected is given in alphabetical order by Dáil constituency.

Changes

On 24 February 1994, Proinsias De Rossa (DL) sought to direct that the writ be moved for the by-elections in Dublin South-Central, and Enda Kenny (FG) sought to direct that the writ be moved for the by-elections in Mayo West. This was opposed by the government. The government moved the writs on 18 May 1994. The by-elections were held at the same date as the European Parliament election and the local elections.

See also
Members of the 20th Seanad

References

External links
Houses of the Oireachtas: Debates: 27th Dáil

Further reading

 
27th Dáil
27